The 1978 Toronto Blue Jays season was the franchise's second season of Major League Baseball. It resulted in the Blue Jays finishing seventh in the American League East with a record of 59 wins and 102 losses.

Offseason 
 October 25, 1977: Phil Roof was released by the Blue Jays.
 November 11, 1977: Luis Gomez was signed as a free agent by the Blue Jays.
 January 10, 1978: Geno Petralli was drafted by the Blue Jays in the 3rd round of the 1978 Major League Baseball draft.
 March 15, 1978: Dennis DeBarr was traded by the Blue Jays to the Cleveland Indians for Rico Carty.
 March 15, 1978: Tom Bruno and cash were traded by the Blue Jays to the St. Louis Cardinals for Rick Bosetti.

Regular season

Opening Day starters 
 Alan Ashby
 Bob Bailor
 Rick Bosetti
 Rico Carty
 Jerry Garvin
 Luis Gómez
 Roy Howell
 Tommy Hutton
 John Mayberry
 Dave McKay
 Dave Lemanczyk

Season standings

Record vs. opponents

Notable transactions 
 April 4, 1978: John Mayberry was purchased by the Blue Jays from the Kansas City Royals.
 May 22, 1978: Joe Coleman was purchased by the Blue Jays from the Oakland Athletics.
 June 6, 1978: 1978 Major League Baseball draft
Lloyd Moseby was drafted by the Blue Jays in the 1st round (2nd pick).
Dave Stieb was drafted by the Blue Jays in the 5th round.
 August 15, 1978: Rico Carty was traded by the Blue Jays to the Oakland Athletics for Willie Horton and Phil Huffman.

Roster

Game log 

|- align="center" bgcolor="bbbbbb"
| – || April 6 || @ Tigers || colspan=6|Postponed (rain) Rescheduled for April 7
|- align="center" bgcolor="ffbbbb"
|  1 || April 7 ||  @ Tigers || 6–2 || Fidrych (1–0) || Lemanczyk (0–1) || || 52,528 || 0–1
|- align="center" bgcolor="bbffbb"
|  2 || April 8 ||  @ Tigers || 5–2 || Garvin (1–0) || Slaton (0–1) || Willis (1) || 12,413 || 1–1
|- align="center" bgcolor="ffbbbb"
|  3 || April 9 ||  @ Tigers || 8–4 || Billingham (1–0) || Underwood (0–1) || Faucault (1) || 9,169 || 1–2
|- align="center" bgcolor="ffbbbb"
|  4 || April 11 ||  @ White Sox || 9–5 || Kravec (1–0) || Jefferson (0–1) || Torrealba (1) || 3,347 || 1–3
|- align="center" bgcolor="ffbbbb"
|  5 || April 12 ||  @ White Sox || 5–4 || Stone (1–0) || Lemanczyk (0–2) || LaGrow (2) || 5,742 || 1–4
|- align="center" bgcolor="bbffbb"
|  6 || April 14 ||  Tigers || 10–8 || Kirkwood (1–0) || Wilcox (0–1) || Murphy (1) || 35,761 || 2–4
|- align="center" bgcolor="ffbbbb"
|  7 || April 15 ||  Tigers || 6–3 || Billingham (2–0) || Willis (0–1) || Faucault (2) || 15,024 || 2–5
|- align="center" bgcolor="ffbbbb"
|  8 || April 16 ||  Tigers || 4–3 || Crawford (1–0) || Clancy (0–1) || || 17,088 || 2–6
|- align="center" bgcolor="ffbbbb"
|  9 || April 17 ||  Royals || 3–1 || Gura (1–0) || Jefferson (0–2) || Hrabosky (3) || 10,169 || 2–7
|- align="center" bgcolor="ffbbbb"
| 10 || April 18 ||  Royals || 5–0 || Splittorff (3–0) || Lemanczyk (0–3) || || 10,218 || 2–8
|- align="center" bgcolor="bbffbb"
| 11 || April 19 ||  Yankees || 4–3 || Murphy (1–0) || Gossage (0–3) || || 13,306 || 3–8
|- align="center" bgcolor="bbbbbb"
| – || April 20 || Yankees || colspan=6|Postponed (rain) Rescheduled for September 20
|- align="center" bgcolor="ffbbbb"
| 12 || April 21 ||  White Sox || 11–2 || Barrios (1–1) || Underwood (0–2) || LaGrow (3) || 10,108 || 3–9
|- align="center" bgcolor="bbffbb"
| 13 || April 22 ||  White Sox || 4–2 || Clancy (1–1) || Wood (0–3) || Willis (2) || 44,327 || 4–9
|- align="center" bgcolor="bbffbb"
| 14 || April 23 ||  White Sox || 4–0 || Jefferson (1–2) || Stone (1–1) || || 17,427 || 5–9
|- align="center" bgcolor="ffbbbb"
| 15 || April 24 ||  Indians || 4–2 || Hood (1–0) || Lemanczyk (0–4) || Kern (1) || 10,776 || 5–10
|- align="center" bgcolor="ffbbbb"
| 16 || April 25 ||  Indians || 6–5 || Garland (2–2) || Garvin (1–1) || Kinney (2) || 11,348 || 5–11
|- align="center" bgcolor="bbffbb"
| 17 || April 26 ||  @ Royals || 3–1 || Murphy (2–0) || Splittorff (4–1) || || 19,545 || 6–11
|- align="center" bgcolor="bbffbb"
| 18 || April 27 ||  @ Royals || 8–7 || Moore (1–0) || Bird (1–1) || Willis (3) || 17,422 || 7–11
|- align="center" bgcolor="ffbbbb"
| 19 || April 28 ||  @ Angels || 5–4 || Miller (1–0) || Jefferson (1–3) || LaRoche (5) || 16,575 || 7–12
|- align="center" bgcolor="ffbbbb"
| 20 || April 29 ||  @ Angels || 5–0 || Ryan (1–1) || Lemanczyk (0–5) || || 24,354 || 7–13
|- align="center" bgcolor="bbffbb"
| 21 || April 30 ||  @ Angels || 9–3 || Garvin (2–1) || Knapp (3–2) || || 27,367 || 8–13
|-

|- align="center" bgcolor="ffbbbb"
| 22 || May 2 ||  @ Athletics || 2–1 || Keough (2–0) || Underwood (0–3) || Sosa (4) || 5,663 || 8–14
|- align="center" bgcolor="ffbbbb"
| 23 || May 3 ||  @ Athletics || 11–3 || Broberg (4–0) || Clancy (1–2) || Lacey (2) || 2,512 || 8–15
|- align="center" bgcolor="ffbbbb"
| 24 || May 5 ||  @ Mariners || 9–1 || Honeycutt (2–3) || Jefferson (1–4) || || 4,824 || 8–16
|- align="center" bgcolor="ffbbbb"
| 25 || May 6 ||  @ Mariners || 6–0 || Mitchell (2–3) || Lemanczyk (0–6) || || 7,589 || 8–17
|- align="center" bgcolor="ffbbbb"
| 26 || May 7 ||  @ Mariners || 9–7 || Romo (3–0) || Willis (0–2) || || 12,489 || 8–18
|- align="center" bgcolor="bbbbbb"
| – || May 8 || Athletics || colspan=6|Postponed (rain) Rescheduled for July 21
|- align="center" bgcolor="bbffbb"
| 27 || May 9 ||  Athletics || 4–0 || Underwood (1–3) || Broberg (4–1) || || 11,339 || 9–18
|- align="center" bgcolor="bbffbb"
| 28 || May 10 ||  Athletics || 3–1 || Clancy (2–2) || Langford (0–2) || || 21,766 || 10–18
|- align="center" bgcolor="bbffbb"
| 29 || May 12 ||  Mariners || 8–3 || Jefferson (2–4) || Rawley (0–3) || || 11,518 || 11–18
|- align="center" bgcolor="ffbbbb"
| 30 || May 13 ||  Mariners || 9–6 || Pole (3–4) || Lemanczyk (0–7) || Romo (3) || 21,350 || 11–19
|- align="center" bgcolor="bbbbbb"
| – || May 14 || Mariners || colspan=6|Postponed (rain) Rescheduled for July 24
|- align="center" bgcolor="bbffbb"
| 31 || May 15 ||  Angels || 10–6 || Moore (2–0) || Hartzell (0–3) || || 11,295 || 12–19
|- align="center" bgcolor="bbffbb"
| 32 || May 16 ||  Angels || 5–4 || Willis (1–2) || Aase (2–2) || Murphy (2) || 12,044 || 13–19
|- align="center" bgcolor="bbbbbb"
| – || May 17 || @ Orioles || colspan=6|Postponed (rain) Rescheduled for July 5
|- align="center" bgcolor="ffbbbb"
| 33 || May 18 ||  @ Orioles || 5–3 || Flanagan (4–3) ||Clancy (2–3) || || 4,255 || 13–20
|- align="center" bgcolor="ffbbbb"
| 34 || May 19 ||  Yankees || 11–3 || Tidrow (2–3) || Jefferson (2–5) || || 26,025 || 13–21
|- align="center" bgcolor="bbffbb"
| 35 || May 20 ||  Yankees || 10–8 || Lemanczyk (1–7) || Clay (0–2) || || 30,550 || 14–21
|- align="center" bgcolor="ffbbbb"
| 36 || May 21 ||  Yankees || 2–1 || Figueroa (5–1) || Underwood (1–4) || Gossage (6) || || 14–22
|- align="center" bgcolor="ffbbbb"
| 37 || May 21 ||  Yankees || 9–1 || Clay (1–2) || Garvin (2–2) || || 41,308 || 14–23
|- align="center" bgcolor="ffbbbb"
| 38 || May 22 ||  Red Sox || 5–4 || Ripley (1–3) || Clancy (2–4) || Stanley (3) || 25,054 || 14–24
|- align="center" bgcolor="bbffbb"
| 39 || May 23 ||  Red Sox || 2–1 (12) || Jefferson (3–5) || Campbell (2–4) || || 14,578 || 15–24
|- align="center" bgcolor="ffbbbb"
| 40 || May 24 ||  Red Sox || 8–2 || Torrez (6–2) || Lemanczyk (1–8) || || 28,825 || 15–25
|- align="center" bgcolor="ffbbbb"
| 41 || May 25 ||  Red Sox || 9–5 || Eckersley (4–1) || Underwood (1–5) || Drago (4) || 17,197 || 15–26
|- align="center" bgcolor="ffbbbb"
| 42 || May 26 ||  @ Yankees || 4–3 || Lyle (3–1) || Garvin (2–3) || || 24,171 || 15–27
|- align="center" bgcolor="bbffbb"
| 43 || May 27 ||  @ Yankees || 4–1 || Clancy (3–4) || Figueroa (5–2) || Murphy (3) || 56,078 || 16–27
|- align="center" bgcolor="ffbbbb"
| 44 || May 28 ||  @ Yankees || 5–3 || Guidry (7–0) || Jefferson (3–6) || || 41,534 || 16–28
|- align="center" bgcolor="ffbbbb"
| 45 || May 28 ||  @ Yankees || 6–5 (13) || Gossage (3–4) || Murphy (2–1) || || 42,344 || 16–29
|- align="center" bgcolor="ffbbbb"
| 46 || May 29 ||  @ Red Sox || 5–4 || Torrez (7–2) || Underwood (1–6) || || 25,935 || 16–30
|- align="center" bgcolor="ffbbbb"
| 47 || May 30 ||  @ Red Sox || 4–0 || Eckersley (5–1) || Garvin (2–4) || || 25,853 || 16–31
|- align="center" bgcolor="bbffbb"
| 48 || May 31 ||  @ Red Sox || 6–2 || Clancy (4–4) || Lee (7–2) || || 27,945 || 17–31
|-

|- align="center" bgcolor="bbffbb"
| 49 || June 2 ||  Rangers || 3–1 || Jefferson (4–6) || Matlack (5–6) || || 25,273 || 18–31
|- align="center" bgcolor="bbffbb"
| 50 || June 3 ||  Rangers || 4–3 || Underwood (2–6) || Umbarger (2–5) || Murphy (4) || 32,021 || 19–31
|- align="center" bgcolor="ffbbbb"
| 51 || June 4 ||  Rangers || 9–5 || Ellis (4–2) || Lemanczyk (1–9) || Comer (1) || 28,374 || 19–32
|- align="center" bgcolor="bbbbbb"
| – || June 7 || @ Indians || colspan=6|Postponed (rain) Rescheduled for June 25
|- align="center" bgcolor="bbbbbb"
| – || June 7 || @ Indians || colspan=6|Postponed (rain) Rescheduled for September 11
|- align="center" bgcolor="ffbbbb"
| 52 || June 9 ||  @ Brewers || 3–2 (10) || Caldwell (6–3) || Murphy (2–2) || || 9,959 || 19–33
|- align="center" bgcolor="ffbbbb"
| 53 || June 10 ||  @ Brewers || 5–0 || Travers (3–2) || Garvin (2–5) || || 25,889 || 19–34
|- align="center" bgcolor="ffbbbb"
| 54 || June 11 ||  @ Brewers || 2–1 || Sorensen (8–4) || Underwood (2–7) || || || 19–35
|- align="center" bgcolor="ffbbbb"
| 55 || June 11 ||  @ Brewers || 5–4 || Stein (2–1) || Murphy (2–3) || || 21,568 || 19–36
|- align="center" bgcolor="bbbbbb"
| – || June 12 || Twins || colspan=6|Postponed (rain) Rescheduled for June 13
|- align="center" bgcolor="ffbbbb"
| 56 || June 13 ||  Twins || 2–0 || Goltz (3–4) || Moore (2–1) || Marshall (8) || || 19–37
|- align="center" bgcolor="ffbbbb"
| 57 || June 13 ||  Twins || 7–2 || Zahn (6–4) || Clancy (4–5) || || 14,489 || 19–38
|- align="center" bgcolor="ffbbbb"
| 58 || June 14 ||  Brewers || 7–5 || Castro (2–0) || Murphy (2–4) || || || 19–39
|- align="center" bgcolor="ffbbbb"
| 59 || June 14 ||  Brewers || 5–0 || Augustine (6–8) || Garvin (2–6) || || 28,346 || 19–40
|- align="center" bgcolor="bbffbb"
| 60 || June 16 ||  @ Rangers || 8–3 || Underwood (3–7)  || Ellis (5–3) || || || 20–40
|- align="center" bgcolor="bbffbb"
| 61 || June 16 ||  @ Rangers || 5–2 || Jefferson (5–6) || Moret (0–1) || Murphy (5) || 20,660 || 21–40
|- align="center" bgcolor="ffbbbb"
| 62 || June 17 ||  @ Rangers || 13–2 || Jenkins (7–3) || Clancy (4–6) || || 30,033 || 21–41
|- align="center" bgcolor="ffbbbb"
| 63 || June 18 ||  @ Rangers || 3–2 || Cleveland (2–3) || Murphy (2–5) || || 24,645 || 21–42
|- align="center" bgcolor="ffbbbb"
| 64 || June 20 ||  Tigers || 4–3 (13) || Hiller (6–3) || Willis (1–3) || || 31,625 || 21–43
|- align="center" bgcolor="ffbbbb"
| 65 || June 21 ||  Tigers || 10–8 || Crawford (2–2) || Kirkwood (1–1) || Foucault (4) || 29,439 || 21–44
|- align="center" bgcolor="ffbbbb"
| 66 || June 23 ||  @ Indians || 8–3 || Waits (5–7) || Jefferson (5–7) || || 6,514 || 21–45
|- align="center" bgcolor="ffbbbb"
| 67 || June 24 ||  @ Indians || 12–3 || Paxton (4–4) || Clancy (4–7) || || 7,176 || 21–46
|- align="center" bgcolor="bbffbb"
| 68 || June 25 ||  @ Indians || 2–1 || Moore (3–1) || Clyde (4–3) || Cruz (1) || || 22–46
|- align="center" bgcolor="ffbbbb"
| 69 || June 25 ||  @ Indians || 3–2 || Wise (5–10) || Garvin (2–7) || Monge (2) || 21,959 || 22–47
|- align="center" bgcolor="bbffbb"
| 70 || June 26 ||  Orioles || 24–10 || Underwood (4–7) || Flanagan (11–5) || || 16,184 || 23–47
|- align="center" bgcolor="bbffbb"
| 71 || June 27 ||  Orioles || 6–2 || Lemanczyk (2–9) || Palmer (10–6) || Cruz (2) || || 24–47
|- align="center" bgcolor="bbffbb"
| 72 || June 27 ||  Orioles || 9–8 || Cruz (1–0) || Stanhouse (1–5) || || 38,563 || 25–47
|- align="center" bgcolor="bbffbb"
| 73 || June 28 ||  Orioles || 3–2 || Clancy (5–7) || McGregor (8–6) || Murphy (6) || 28,392 || 26–47
|- align="center" bgcolor="ffbbbb"
| 74 || June 30 ||  Indians || 3–0 || Wise (6–10) || Garvin (2–8) || || 16,129 || 26–48
|-

|- align="center" bgcolor="bbffbb"
| 75 || July 1 ||  Indians || 9–3 || Underwood (5–7) || Hood (4–4) || Cruz (3) || 19,277 || 27–48
|- align="center" bgcolor="ffbbbb"
| 76 || July 2 ||  Indians || 2–0 || Waits (6–8) || Lemanczyk (2–10) || Kern (7) || || 27–49
|- align="center" bgcolor="bbffbb"
| 77 || July 2 ||  Indians || 3–1 || Jefferson (6–7) || Freisleben (0–2) || || 28,305 || 28–49
|- align="center" bgcolor="ffbbbb"
| 78 || July 3 ||  @ Tigers || 6–5 || Wilcox (5–7) || Murphy (2–6) || || 21,597 || 28–50
|- align="center" bgcolor="bbffbb"
| 79 || July 4 ||  @ Tigers || 9–2 || Moore (4–1) || Morris (1–4) || || 11,913 || 29–50
|- align="center" bgcolor="ffbbbb"
| 80 || July 5 ||  @ Orioles || 3–1 || Flanagan (12–5) || Garvin (2–9) || || || 29–51
|- align="center" bgcolor="ffbbbb"
| 81 || July 5 ||  @ Orioles || 8–6 || Kerrigan (1–0) || Murphy (2–7) || || 9,886 || 29–52
|- align="center" bgcolor="bbffbb"
| 82 || July 6 ||  @ Orioles || 2–0 || Lemanczyk  (3–10) || Palmer (10–7) || Willis (4) || 14,926 || 30–52
|- align="center" bgcolor="bbffbb"
| 83 || July 7 ||  @ White Sox || 3–2 || Coleman (4–0) || Hinton (1–2) || Cruz (4) || 18,643 || 31–52
|- align="center" bgcolor="bbffbb"
| 84 || July 8 ||  @ White Sox || 3–0 || Clancy (6–7) || Kravec (7–6) || Willis (5) || 23,648 || 32–52
|- align="center" bgcolor="ffbbbb"
| 85 || July 9 ||  @ White Sox || 5–3 || Stone  (7–6) || Underwood (5–8) || Willoughby (11) || 16,493 || 32–53
|- align="center" bgcolor="ffbbbb"
| 86 || July 13 ||  @ Angels || 5–0 || Aase (7–4) || Lemanczyk (3–11) || || 16,625 || 32–54
|- align="center" bgcolor="ffbbbb"
| 87 || July 14 ||  @ Angels || 3–2 (11) || Miller (4–0) || Willis (1–4) || || 20,338 || 32–55
|- align="center" bgcolor="ffbbbb"
| 88 || July 15 ||  @ Athletics || 3–2 || Sosa (6–2) || Underwood (5–9) || || 6,863 || 32–56
|- align="center" bgcolor="ffbbbb"
| 89 || July 16 ||  @ Athletics || 8–5 || Sosa (7–2) || Willis (1–5) || Heaverlo (7) || 3,753 || 32–57
|- align="center" bgcolor="ffbbbb"
| 90 || July 17 ||  @ Athletics || 5–3 || Johnson (7–5) || Garvin (2–10) || || 12,414 || 32–58
|- align="center" bgcolor="bbffbb"
| 91 || July 18 ||  @ Mariners || 13–12 (10) || Murphy (3–7) || Pole (4–11) || || 6,881 || 33–58
|- align="center" bgcolor="ffbbbb"
| 92 || July 19 ||  @ Mariners || 6–2 || Honeycutt (3–5) || Jefferson (6–8) || Montague (2) || 7,434 || 33–59
|- align="center" bgcolor="ffbbbb"
| 93 || July 21 ||  Athletics || 7–2 || Renko (4–4) || Moore (4–2) || || || 33–60
|- align="center" bgcolor="bbffbb"
| 94 || July 21 ||  Athletics || 5–4 || Murphy (4–7) || Lacey (6–5) || Cruz (5) || 21,050 || 34–60
|- align="center" bgcolor="bbffbb"
| 95 || July 22 ||  Athletics || 7–3 || Clancy (7–7) || Johnson (7–6) || || 21,028 || 35–60
|- align="center" bgcolor="ffbbbb"
| 96 || July 23 ||  Athletics || 5–3 || Langford (3–7) || Garvin (2–11) || Heaverlo (8) || 23,153 || 35–61
|- align="center" bgcolor="ffbbbb"
| 97 || July 24 ||  Mariners || 1–0 || Honeycutt (4–5) || Lemanczyk (3–12) || || || 35–62
|- align="center" bgcolor="ffbbbb"
| 98 || July 24 ||  Mariners || 7–2 || Colborn (2–8) || Jefferson (6–9) || Romo (9) || 16,291 || 35–63
|- align="center" bgcolor="ffbbbb"
| 99 || July 25 ||  Mariners || 4–2 || Abbott (4–7) || Underwood (5–10) || || 14,103 || 35–64
|- align="center" bgcolor="bbffbb"
|100 || July 26 ||  @ Twins || 5–1 || Moore (5–2) || Goltz (9–7) || || 6,014 || 36–64
|- align="center" bgcolor="ffbbbb"
|101 || July 27 ||  @ Twins || 6–3 || Perzanowski (1–0) || Clancy (7–8) || || 18,285 || 36–65
|- align="center" bgcolor="bbffbb"
|102 || July 28 ||  Brewers || 3–2 (11) || Cruz (2–0) || Castro (3–2) || || 17,060 || 37–65
|- align="center" bgcolor="bbffbb"
|103 || July 29 ||  Brewers || 4–3 || Lemanczyk (4–12) || Sorensen (12–8) || Cruz (6) || 25,037 || 38–65
|- align="center" bgcolor="ffbbbb"
|104 || July 30 ||  Brewers || 10–5 || Stein (3–2) || Murphy (4–8) || || 21,511 || 38–66
|- align="center" bgcolor="bbffbb"
|105 || July 31 ||  Tigers || 8–7 (14) || Coleman (5–0) || Sykes (5–5) || || 18,032 || 39–66
|-

|- align="center" bgcolor="ffbbbb"
|106 || August 1 ||  Tigers || 3–2 || Slaton (11–8) || Clancy (7–9) || || 19,265 || 39–67
|- align="center" bgcolor="bbffbb"
|107 || August 4 ||  @ Royals || 5–4 || Cruz (3–0) || Hrabosky (4–5) || || 35,064 || 40–67 
|- align="center" bgcolor="ffbbbb"
|108 || August 5 ||  @ Royals || 5–3 || Gura (9–2) || Lemanczyk (4–13) || Mingori (6) || 34,179 || 40–68
|- align="center" bgcolor="ffbbbb"
|109 || August 6 ||  @ Royals || 12–5 || Gale (13–3) || Moore (5–3) || || 35,404 || 40–69 
|- align="center" bgcolor="bbffbb"
|110 || August 7 ||  Orioles || 2–1 || Clancy (8–9) || Martínez (8–9) || || 19,184 || 41–69 
|- align="center" bgcolor="bbffbb"
|111 || August 8 ||  Orioles || 5–3 || Underwood (6–10) || Flanagan (14–10) || Cruz (7) || 19,052 || 42–69 
|- align="center" bgcolor="bbffbb"
|112 || August 9 ||  White Sox || 8–0 || Jefferson (7–9) || Stone (9–8) || || 24,282 || 43–69 
|- align="center" bgcolor="bbffbb"
|113 || August 10 ||  White Sox || 7–3 || Garvin (3–11) || Wood (10–10) || Cruz (8) || 15,508 || 44–69 
|- align="center" bgcolor="ffbbbb"
|114 || August 11 ||  Royals || 9–8 (10) || Hrabosky (5–5) || Cruz (3–1) || || 20,602 || 44–70
|- align="center" bgcolor="bbffbb"
|115 || August 12 ||  Royals || 5–2 || Clancy (9–9) || Splittorff (13–10) || || 23,132 || 45–70 
|- align="center" bgcolor="bbffbb"
|116 || August 13 ||  Royals || 3–2 (10) || Willis (2–5) || Hrabosky (5–6) || || 30,270 || 46–70 
|- align="center" bgcolor="ffbbbb"
|117 || August 15 ||  @ Brewers || 9–1 || Augustine (11–11) || Lemanczyk (4–14) || || || 46–71
|- align="center" bgcolor="bbbbbb"
| – || August 15 || @ Brewers || colspan=6|Postponed (rain) Rescheduled for August 16
|- align="center" bgcolor="ffbbbb"
|118 || August 16 ||  @ Brewers || 8–1 || Caldwell (15–7) || Jefferson (7–10) || || || 46–72
|- align="center" bgcolor="ffbbbb"
|119 || August 16 ||  @ Brewers || 3–2 || Rodríguez (4–5) || Moore (5–4) || McClure (8) || 16,920 || 46–73 
|- align="center" bgcolor="ffbbbb"
|120 || August 17 ||  @ Brewers || 6–0 || Travers (8–7) || Clancy (9–10) || || 18,829 || 46–74 
|- align="center" bgcolor="ffbbbb"
|121 || August 18 ||  @ Twins || 4–3 (10) || Holly (1–1) || Murphy (4–9) || || 4,599 || 46–75 
|- align="center" bgcolor="ffbbbb"
|122 || August 19 ||  @ Twins || 5–0 || Serum (7–5) || Garvin (3–12) || || 10,745 || 46–76 
|- align="center" bgcolor="bbffbb"
|123 || August 20 ||  @ Twins || 6–2 || Kirkwood (2–1) || Perzanowski (2–5) || Murphy (7) || 11,685 || 47–76 
|- align="center" bgcolor="bbffbb"
|124 || August 21 ||  Rangers || 8–6 || Murphy (5–9) || Umbarger (4–8) || || 16,001 || 48–76 
|- align="center" bgcolor="bbffbb"
|125 || August 22 ||  Rangers || 3–1 || Clancy (10–10) || Medich (7–7) || Cruz (9) || 17,492 || 49–76 
|- align="center" bgcolor="bbffbb"
|126 || August 23 ||  @ Tigers || 4–3 (12) || Cruz (4–1) || Rozema (6–8) || || || 50–76
|- align="center" bgcolor="bbffbb"
|127 || August 23 ||  @ Tigers || 5–4 || Garvin (4–12) || Sykes (6–6) || Willis (6) || 26,631 || 51–76 
|- align="center" bgcolor="ffbbbb"
|128 || August 24 ||  @ Tigers || 5–2 || Wilcox (11–8) || Moore (5–5) || || 13,314 || 51–77
|- align="center" bgcolor="bbffbb"
|129 || August 25 ||  Twins || 7–3 || Kirkwood (3–1) || Serum (7–6) || Willis (7) || 15,206 || 52–77 
|- align="center" bgcolor="bbffbb"
|130 || August 26 ||  Twins || 4–3 (10) || Cruz (5–1) || Zahn (9–13) || || 25,601 || 53–77 
|- align="center" bgcolor="ffbbbb"
|131 || August 27 ||  Twins || 3–2 (11) || Marshall (7–11) || Willis (2–6) || || 22,023 || 53–78
|- align="center" bgcolor="ffbbbb"
|132 || August 28 ||  @ Rangers || 11–3 || Comer (7–3) || Underwood (6–11) || Barker (4) || 7,400 || 53–79 
|- align="center" bgcolor="bbffbb"
|133 || August 29 ||  @ Rangers || 4–1 || Moore (6–5) || Matlack (12–11) || || 9,483 || 54–79 
|- align="center" bgcolor="ffbbbb"
|134 || August 30 ||  @ Red Sox || 2–1 || Eckersley (16–5) || Kirkwood (3–2) || || || 54–80
|- align="center" bgcolor="bbffbb"
|135 || August 30 ||  @ Red Sox || 7–6 || Cruz (6–1) || Stanley (12–2) || || 32,825 || 55–80 
|-

|- align="center" bgcolor="ffbbbb"
|136 || September 1 ||  Angels || 6–4 || Hartzell (6–8) || Jefferson (7–11) || LaRoche (19) || 16,757 || 55–81
|- align="center" bgcolor="ffbbbb"
|137 || September 2 ||  Angels || 2–0 || Tanana (17–9) || Clancy (10–11) || || 21,099 || 55–82 
|- align="center" bgcolor="ffbbbb"
|138 || September 3 ||  Angels || 3–1 || Knapp (14–7) || Underwood (6–12) || || 20,054 || 55–83 
|- align="center" bgcolor="ffbbbb"
|139 || September 4 ||  Indians || 5–4 || Paxton (10–8) || Moore (6–6) || || 14,364 || 55–84 
|- align="center" bgcolor="ffbbbb"
|140 || September 5 ||  Indians || 6–2 || Waits (11–13) || Kirkwood (3–3) || || 11,060 || 55–85 
|- align="center" bgcolor="ffbbbb"
|141 || September 6 ||  Brewers || 7–0 || Sorensen (16–10) || Jefferson (7–12) || || 21,390 || 55–86 
|- align="center" bgcolor="bbffbb"
|142 || September 7 ||  Brewers || 5–4 || Cruz (7–1) || McClure (2–5) || || 12,092 || 56–86
|- align="center" bgcolor="ffbbbb"
|143 || September 8 ||  Orioles || 5–4 || Briles (4–4) || Underwood (6–13) || Stanhouse (22) || 14,155 || 56–87
|- align="center" bgcolor="ffbbbb"
|144 || September 9 ||  Orioles || 4–0 || McGregor (14–12) || Moore (6–7) || || 29,255 || 56–88
|- align="center" bgcolor="ffbbbb"
|145 || September 11 ||  @ Indians || 6–4 || Waits (12–13) || Jefferson (7–13) || || || 56–89
|- align="center" bgcolor="bbffbb"
|146 || September 11 ||  @ Indians || 7–1 || Kirkwood (4–3) || Wise (9–19) || || 3,356 || 57–89
|- align="center" bgcolor="bbbbbb"
| – || September 12 || @ Indians || colspan=6|Postponed (rain) Not rescheduled
|- align="center" bgcolor="ffbbbb"
|147 || September 15 ||  @ Orioles || 8–3 || Palmer (19–12) || Cruz (7–2) || || 4,000 || 57–90
|- align="center" bgcolor="ffbbbb"
|148 || September 16 ||  @ Orioles || 11–1 || Martínez  (14–11) || Jefferson (7–14) || || 10,263 || 57–91 
|- align="center" bgcolor="ffbbbb"
|149 || September 17 ||  @ Orioles || 5–0 || Flanagan (18–13) || Kirkwood (4–4) || || 4,436 || 57–92 
|- align="center" bgcolor="bbffbb"
|150 || September 20 ||  Yankees || 8–1 || Willis (3–6) || Guidry (22–3) || || || 58–92
|- align="center" bgcolor="ffbbbb"
|151 || September 20 ||  Yankees || 3–2 || Gossage (10–10) || Cruz (7–3) || || 38,080 || 58–93
|- align="center" bgcolor="ffbbbb"
|152 || September 21 ||  Yankees || 7–1 || Hunter (11–5) || Moore (6–8) || Gossage (24) || 28,653 || 58–94 
|- align="center" bgcolor="bbffbb"
|153 || September 22 ||  Red Sox || 5–4 || Murphy (6–9) || Hassler (3–5) || || 22,172 || 59–94 
|- align="center" bgcolor="ffbbbb"
|154 || September 23 ||  Red Sox || 3–1 || Tiant (11–8) || Jefferson (7–15) || || 30,059 || 59–95
|- align="center" bgcolor="ffbbbb"
|155 || September 24 ||  Red Sox || 7–6 (14) || Drago (4–4) || Buskey (0–1) || || 33,618 || 59–96 
|- align="center" bgcolor="ffbbbb"
|156 || September 26 ||  @ Yankees || 4–1 || Figueroa (19–9) || Underwood (6–14) || Gossage (25) || 20,535 || 59–97 
|- align="center" bgcolor="ffbbbb"
|157 || September 27 ||  @ Yankees || 5–1 || Hunter (12–5) || Willis (3–7) || || 20,052 || 59–98 
|- align="center" bgcolor="ffbbbb"
|158 || September 28 ||  @ Yankees || 3–1 || Guidry (24–3) || Moore (6–9) || || 30,480 || 59–99 
|- align="center" bgcolor="ffbbbb"
|159 || September 29 ||  @ Red Sox || 11–0 || Stanley (15–2) || Clancy (10–12) || || 29,626 || 59–100 
|- align="center" bgcolor="ffbbbb"
|160 || September 30 ||  @ Red Sox || 5–1 || Eckersley (20–8) || Jefferson (7–16) || || 32,659 || 59–101
|-

|- align="center" bgcolor="ffbbbb"
|161 || October 1 ||  @ Red Sox || 5–0 || Tiant (13–8) || Kirkwood (4–5) || || 29,201 || 59–102 
|-

Player stats

Batting

Starters by position 
Note: Pos = Position; G = Games played; AB = At bats; R = Runs scored; H = Hits; 2B = Doubles; 3B = Triples; Avg = Batting average; HR = Home runs; RBI = Runs batted in; SB = Stolen bases

Other batters 
Note: G = Games played; AB = At bats; R = Runs scored; H = Hits; 2B = Doubles; 3B = Triples; Avg. = Batting average; HR = Home runs; RBI = Runs batted in; SB = Stolen bases

Pitching

Starting pitchers 
Note: G = Games pitched; GS = Games started; IP = Innings pitched; W = Wins; L = Losses; ERA = Earned run average; R = Runs allowed; ER = Earned runs allowed; BB = Walks allowed; K = Strikeouts

Other pitchers 
Note: G = Games pitched; GS = Games started; IP = Innings pitched; W = Wins; L = Losses; ERA = Earned run average; R = Runs allowed; ER = Earned runs allowed; BB = Walks allowed; K = Strikeouts

Relief pitchers 
Note: G = Games pitched; IP = Innings pitched; W = Wins; L = Losses; SV = Saves; ERA = Earned run average; R = Runs allowed; ER = Earned runs allowed; BB = Walks allowed; K = Strikeouts

Awards and honors 
All-Star Game
Roy Howell, reserve

Farm system

Notes

References 
1978 Toronto Blue Jays team page at Baseball Reference
1978 Toronto Blue Jays team page at www.baseball-almanac.com

Toronto Blue Jays seasons
Toronto Blue Jays season
1978 in Canadian sports
1978 in Toronto